Newtown, is a townland in the Barony of Iffa and Offa East in County Tipperary, Ireland. It is in the civil parish of Killaloan	
and is one of nineteen townlands known as Newtown in County Tipperary.

References

Townlands of County Tipperary